Serpentine is the fourth album by the German gothic metal band Flowing Tears, the second under the moniker Flowing Tears. This album would also be the last album to include Stefanie Duchêne on lead vocals, as she had to leave the band in 2004 to tend to her pregnancy at the time.

Track listing

Personnel 
Stefanie Duchêne – vocals
Benjamin Buss – guitars, programming
Frederic Lesny – bass guitar
Stefan Gemballa – drums

References

External links 
Flowing Tears official website

2002 albums
Flowing Tears albums
Century Media Records albums
Albums produced by Waldemar Sorychta